Denis Chudý (born 1 February 2000) is a Slovak footballer who plays for Beluša as a goalkeeper.

Club career

AS Trenčín
Chudý made his Fortuna Liga debut for AS Trenčín against Senica on 16 February 2019.

References

External links
 AS Trenčín official profile 
 Futbalnet profile 
 
 

2000 births
Living people
Sportspeople from Topoľčany
Slovak footballers
Slovakia under-21 international footballers
Association football goalkeepers
AS Trenčín players
FK Dubnica players
FC Spartak Trnava players
FC Rohožník players
2. Liga (Slovakia) players
Slovak Super Liga players